Automatons is the second solo album by Svoy. It was originally released in Japan August 19, 2009, on historic P-Vine Records/Blues Interactions. U.S./International release followed on November 2, 2010, on Sixteenth Republic Records.

Background

Automatons expands upon artist's signature diverse sound by simultaneously paying tribute to his broad scope of musical influences and the sonic language of so-called "processed humanity". Svoy created 15 new selections of music and lyrics (including original cover of the Bee Gees' classic "Lonely Days" and an excerpt from "Silentium!", a poem by Fyodor Tyutchev). Two songs on Automatons were written and performed in collaboration with Adam Levy (multi platinum-selling songwriter/singer/guitarist for Tracy Chapman, Amos Lee and Norah Jones' Handsome Band, grandson of George Wyle, author of Christmas song “It’s the Most Wonderful Time of the Year”); as well as Ilya Lagutenko (frontman/leader of Russia's superstar rock band Mumiy Troll, MTV Award winner, legendary multi-hit songwriter/singer/actor, whose acting credits include "Night Watch" (2005), international blockbuster by director Timur Bekmambetov ("Wanted", 2008)).

Album's lead single "Beautiful Thing" reached #69 on the Billboard Japan Hot TOP 100 Airplay and #82 on Billboard Japan Hot 100 Singles chart. Besides remaining in top 40 and 100 airplay charts of numerous major Japanese radio networks for over 8 weeks, the song peaked at #3 on Alpha Station FM Kyoto 89.4's TOP 40 Overseas Chart. Also in 2009, Automatons reached #100 on the Billboard Japan Top Independent Albums and Singles chart.

In February, 2011, the album and its title track received two nominations at The 10th Independent Music Awards in Best Dance/Electronica Album and Best Dance/Electronica Song categories, winning in the latter category in March, 2011. 10th Independent Music Awards judging panel included Seal, Fall Out Boy, Portishead, McCoy Tyner, Counting Crows, Aerosmith, Ozzy Osbourne, Suzanne Vega, Jesse Harris, Tom Waits, Aimee Mann, Jonatha Brooke among other notable artists and music industry professionals.

In July 2011, it was announced that Automatons also won The 10th Independent Music Awards' Vox Populi (fan-based portion of the annual awards) in both Best Dance/Electronica Song and Best Dance/Electronica Album categories.

Track listing

Personnel 
 Svoy – keyboards, vocals, spoken word, producer, programming, vocal arrangement, sound engineering, mixing, mastering, art direction, design
 Adam Levy – guest artist, lead vocals, guitar (track 9)
 Ilya Lagutenko – guest artist, lead vocals (track 7)
 Kevin Reagan – Svoy logo design
 Fernanda Faya – photography

Charts

Release history

References 

2009 albums
Svoy albums